Nationwide International was a branch of Nationwide Building Society, based in Douglas on the Isle of Man and licensed in the Isle of Man by the Isle of Man Financial Services Authority. It provided a range  of offshore savings accounts denominated in euro, pound sterling and US dollar.

Nationwide International's assets were in excess of £2.76 billion as at 31 March 2008, increasing to £3.69 billion by 31 March 2009, making it one of the largest deposit takers in the Isle of Man.

Nationwide International confirmed in a statement issued on 22 September 2016 that it would be closing in mid-2017 and on 13 February 2017 confirmed all accounts would be closed by 30 June 2017. 
  Local media sources confirm up to 70 jobs will be lost as a consequence of the closure.

References

External links

Offshore finance
Banks established in 1990
Banks disestablished in 2017
Defunct banks of the Isle of Man
British companies established in 1990
British companies disestablished in 2017
1990 establishments in the Isle of Man
2013 disestablishments in the Isle of Man